Songs from the Second Floor is a Swedish black comedy-drama film which was released to cinemas in Sweden on 6 October 2000, written and directed by Roy Andersson. It presents a series of disconnected vignettes that together interrogate aspects of modern life. It uses quotations from the work of Peruvian poet César Vallejo as a recurring motif.

It is the first film in a trilogy, followed by You, the Living (2007) and A Pigeon Sat on a Branch Reflecting on Existence (2014).

Plot
A man is standing in a subway car, his face dirty with soot. In his right hand he carries a plastic bag with documents, or rather, the charred leftovers of them. In a corridor a man is clinging desperately to the legs of the boss who just fired him. He is screaming: "I've been here for thirty years!" In a coffee shop someone is waiting for his father, who just burned his furniture company for insurance money. Traffic jams and self-flagellating stock brokers are filling up the streets while an economist, desperate for a solution to the problem of work becoming too expensive, gazes into the crystal ball of a scryer. The main men all have goals but their destinations change during the story.

Cast
 Lars Nordh as Kalle
 Stefan Larsson as Stefan
 Bengt C. W. Carlsson as Lennart
 Torbjörn Fahlström as Pelle Wigert
 Sten Andersson as Lasse
 Rolando Núñez as the foreigner
 Lucio Vucina as the magician
 Per Jörnelius as the sawed man
 Peter Roth as Tomas
 Klas-Gösta Olsson as the speechwriter
 Nils-Åke Eriksson as patient
 Hanna Eriksson as Mia
 Tommy Johansson as Uffe
 Sture Olsson as Sven
 Fredrik Sjögren as the Russian boy

Reception
Film critic J. Hoberman from The Village Voice concluded about the film: "Easier to respect than enthuse over, Andersson's rigorous personal vision is not only distanced but distancing." Roger Ebert of Chicago Sun-Times gave the film four stars out of four and wrote, "You may not enjoy it but you will not forget it." Anton Bitel, writing for Eye for Film, felt that "the heavy symbolism overwhelms the storytelling."

On review aggregator Rotten Tomatoes, the film received an 89% approval rating, based on 35 reviews, with an average rating of 7.5/10. On Metacritic, the film was given a score of 76 out of 100, based on 14 critics, indicating "generally favorable reviews."

Awards and nominations
Wins

Bodil Awards
Best Non-American Film (Bedste ikke amerikanske film) Roy Andersson (director)
Cannes Film Festival
Jury Prize (Roy Andersson)
Brothers Manaki International Film Festival 
Audience Award István Borbás
Norwegian International Film Festival
Norwegian Film Critics Award Roy Andersson
Guldbagge Award
Best Film (Bästa film) Lisa Alwert
Best Direction (Bästa regi) Roy Andersson
Best Screenplay (Bästa manuskript) Roy Andersson
Best Cinematography (Bästa foto) István Borbás and Jesper Klevenas
Best Achievement (Bästa prestation) Jan Alvemark

Nominations

Cannes Film Festival
Golden Palm
British Independent Film Awards 
Best Foreign Independent Film - Foreign Language

See also
 César Vallejo
 List of films with longest production time

References

External links
 
 
 
 
 
 
 
 "The New Cult Canon: Songs from the Second Floor" at The A.V. Club

2000s Swedish-language films
2000 films
2000 black comedy films
Swedish black comedy films
Films directed by Roy Andersson
2000 comedy-drama films
Best Film Guldbagge Award winners
Films whose director won the Best Director Guldbagge Award
Films scored by Benny Andersson
2000s Swedish films